Bianca Solorzano (born March 21, 1974) is an American journalist.

Early life and education
Solorzano was born in Boston, Massachusetts on March 21, 1974. She was raised in Miami, Florida.

Solorzano obtained her Bachelor of Science degree with a double major in broadcast journalism and theatre arts from the University of Miami, where she graduated cum laude. She was also an anchor for the University of Miami's cable news channel.

Career
From 1999–2003, Solorzano was the weekend anchor and three-day weekday reporter at KCRA 3-TV an NBC affiliate in Sacramento, California. Solorzano ha beenl with CBS News since 2006. She currently serves as correspondent for CBS News in New York City and appears on "The Early Show" amongst others. Prior to joining CBS News, Solorzano was an anchor on MSNBC from 2003–2005.

Personal life
Solorzano married Timothy Stewart Lucas in 2008 at St. Bartholomew's Church in New York City. Her parents are Madeline Solorzano and Dr. Oscar Solorzano, who is an orthopedic surgeon. She has two children and resides in New York City.

Awards
In 1998, Solorzano was the recipient of a New York Associahhhhted Press Broadcasters Association Award for Best Interview of the Year for the interview she had with Waneta Hoyt.

References

External links
CBS News bio

1974 births
Living people
People from Boston
University of Miami School of Communication alumni
American women television journalists
People from Miami
CBS News people
MSNBC people
21st-century American journalists
Television anchors from Sacramento, California